The honorary title Pilot-Cosmonaut of the USSR was a state award of the Soviet Union presented to all cosmonauts who flew for the Soviet Space Agency.  Usually accompanying the distinction was the title of Hero of the Soviet Union, the highest title that could be awarded to a Soviet citizen for performing heroic deeds while in service of the state.

History of the title 
The title was established by Decree of the Presidium of the Supreme Soviet on 14 April 1961.  It was awarded until the dissolution of the Soviet Union in 1991 where it was retained by the Law of the Russian Federation 2555-1 dated 20 March 1992 with a few slight amendments and renamed Pilot-Cosmonaut of the Russian Federation.

Award statute 
The title was assigned by the Presidium of the Supreme Soviet for the outstanding feat of space flight.  The insignia of Pilot-Cosmonaut of the USSR is worn on the right side of the chest above orders and decorations.  If worn with honorary titles of the Russian Federation, the latter have precedence.

Award description 
The title is a 25mm wide by 23.8mm high convex pentagon with a gilt silver rim.  In the center is an image of the terrestrial globe with the territory of the Soviet Union enamelled in red.  A gold star denotes Moscow as the point of origin of a gilt orbital path going around the globe once to reach a silver satellite at the upper left of the globe.  A second orbital path, this time enamelled in red, starts at the bottom center of the globe going up in an arc narrowing along the way to reach a gilt spacecraft above the globe.  Along the upper left edge of the pentagon above the globe, the gilt relief inscription "PILOT", along the upper right edge of the pentagon above the globe, the gilt relief inscription "COSMONAUT", along the bottom edge of the pentagon under the globe, the gilt inscription "USSR", along the left and right lower edges of the pentagon, prominent gilt laurel branches.  The reverse of the insignia is plain except for the award serial number.

The insignia is secured to a standard Russian square mount by a ring through the suspension loop. The award is secured to clothing with a threaded stud and nut behind the mount.  The mount is covered by a silk moiré red ribbon.

List of Pilot-Cosmonauts of the USSR
The individuals listed below have all received the honorary title "Pilot-Cosmonaut of the USSR". List is sorted by the serial number of the award.

 1961 — Yuri Gagarin
 1961 — Gherman Titov
 1962 — Andriyan Nikolayev
 1962 — Pavel Popovich
 1963 — Valery Bykovsky
 1963 — Valentina Tereshkova
 1964 — Vladimir Komarov
 1964 — Konstantin Feoktistov
 1964 — Boris Yegorov
 1965 — Pavel Belyayev
 1965 — Alexei Leonov
 1968 — Georgy Beregovoy
 1969 — Vladimir Shatalov
 1969 — Boris Volynov
 1969 — Aleksei Yeliseyev
 1969 — Yevgeny Khrunov
 1969 — Georgy Shonin
 1969 — Valeri Kubasov
 1969 — Anatoly Filipchenko
 1969 — Vladislav Volkov
 1969 — Viktor Gorbatko
 1970 — Vitaly Sevastyanov
 1971 — Nikolay Rukavishnikov
 1971 — Georgy Dobrovolsky (posthumously)
 1971 — Viktor Patsayev (posthumously)
 1973 — Vasily Lazarev
 1973 — Oleg Grigoryevich Makarov
 1973 — Pyotr Klimuk
 1973 — Valentin Lebedev
 1974 — Yury Artyukhin
 1974 — Gennadi Sarafanov
 1974 — Lev Dyomin
 1975 — Aleksei Gubarev
 1975 — Georgy Grechko
 1976 — Vitaly Zholobov
 1976 — Vladimir Aksyonov
 1976 — Vyacheslav Zudov
 1976 — Valery Rozhdestvensky
 1977 — Yury Glazkov
 1977 — Vladimir Kovalyonok
 1977 — Valery Ryumin
 1978 — Yury Romanenko
 1978 — Vladimir Dzhanibekov
 1978 — Aleksandr Ivanchenkov
 1979 — Vladimir Lyakhov
 1980 — Yury Malyshev
 1980 — Leonid Popov
 1980 — Leonid Kizim
 1980 — Gennadi Strekalov
 1981 — Viktor Savinykh
 1982 — Aleksandr Serebrov
 1982 — Svetlana Savitskaya
 1982 — Anatoly Berezovoy
 1983 — Vladimir Titov
 1983 — Aleksandr Pavlovich Aleksandrov
 1984 — Igor Volk
 1984 — Vladimir Solovyov
 1984 — Oleg Atkov
 1985 — Vladimir Vasyutin
 1985 — Aleksandr Aleksandrovich Volkov
 1987 — Aleksandr Viktorenko
 1987 — Aleksandr Laveykin
 1987 — Anatoli Levchenko
 1988 — Anatoly Solovyev
 1988 — Musa Manarov
 1989 — Sergei Krikalev
 1989 — Valeri Polyakov
 1990 — Aleksandr Nikolayevich Balandin
 1991 — Gennadi Manakov
 1991 — Viktor Mikhailovich Afanasyev
 1991 — Anatoly Artsebarsky
 1991 — Toktar Aubakirov

See also

 Roscosmos Cosmonaut Corps
 Pilot-Cosmonaut of the Russian Federation
 Orders, decorations, and medals of the Soviet Union
 Badges and Decorations of the Soviet Union
 Soviet Air Force
 Soviet Space Agency
 Baikonur Cosmodrome

References

External links 
Legal Library of the USSR

Honorary titles of the Soviet Union
Awards established in 1961